An honorary trust, under the law of trusts, is a device by which a person establishes a trust for which there is neither a charitable purpose, nor a private beneficiary to enforce the trust. While such a trust would normally be void for lack of a beneficiary, many jurisdictions have carved out two specific exceptions to this rule: trusts for the care of that person's pets; and trusts to provide for the maintenance of cemetery plots.

The name of the device derives from the lack of any beneficiary legally capable of enforcing an honorary trust: the trustee is bound by honor, but not by law, to carry out the wishes of the creator of the trust.

Like many states, New York has only recently allowed such trusts by statute.

See also

 Purpose trust

Wills and trusts